In the sport of track and field, centenarians compete in the M100 & M105 (men) or W100 (women) age categories of masters athletics. The world records for this age group are ratified by World Masters Athletics, the global sports body for masters track and field. National bodies, such as the USA Masters division of USATF, may also retain national records for the best performances in athletics events recorded by athletes aged 100 and over. In addition, competition-specific records for centenarians are retained for major events, such as World Masters Athletics Championships, World Masters Indoor Athletics Championships, USATF Masters Outdoor Championships, USATF Masters Indoor Championships, and the Senior Games.

Given the small number of people competing in sport at that age, the first time a centenarian masters track and field record was officially listed was in the April 1999 National Masters News issue, and the Spring 1999 Veteran Athletics magazine issue. The first officially approved mark was Ben Levinson's (age 103) 1998 shot put record that was approved by the WAVA (World) Records committee on 1 January 1999 and the USA Masters Record committee on 4 December 1998.

World records

American records

Former American records

See also
List of world records in masters athletics

References

External links
World Masters Athletics - Records
Masters Athletics All Time World Rankings (unofficial)
American Masters Outdoor Track & Field Records

Centenarians
Centenarian World records
Track and field records
Centenarians